Christianne van der Wal-Zeggelink (born 13 November 1973) is a Dutch politician of the People's Party for Freedom and Democracy (VVD). She has been the chair of the People's Party for Freedom and Democracy since 25 November 2017. She is currently serving as Minister for Nature and Nitrogen Policy in the Fourth Rutte cabinet.

References

External links
Official

  Ch. (Christianne) van der Wal-Zeggelink Parlement & Politiek

 
 

1973 births
Living people
Chairmen of the People's Party for Freedom and Democracy
Municipal councillors in Gelderland
People's Party for Freedom and Democracy politicians
Dutch educators
Dutch women educators
University of Amsterdam alumni
People from Oldenzaal
People from Harderwijk
21st-century Dutch politicians
21st-century Dutch women politicians